"Fascinated" is a song by the freestyle girl group Company B. It was the first single released off their 1987 self-titled debut album. It was written and produced by Ish Ledesma, mixed by Ciro llerenea and Randy Miller and released by Atlantic Records.

The song topped the US Billboard Dance Club Songs chart in March 1987 and remained there for four weeks. Soon after, the single was picked up by Top 40 radio, and it charted on the Billboard Hot 100 spending eight weeks in the Top 40 in May and June 1987, peaking at #21. It became Company B's most successful hit single in the U.S. and is one of the first freestyle songs to enter the Top 40 on the Billboard Hot 100.

Legacy

"Fascinated" has been covered by other recording artists, such as Lisa B, the American-born singer Suzanne Palmer, the Canadian singer Emjay, and Nigerian singer Carol Jiani.

In 2021, "Fascinated" was featured in the thirteenth season of RuPaul's Drag Race.

Charts

Weekly charts

Year-end charts

See also
List of number-one dance hits (United States)

References

1987 singles
Songs written by Ish Ledesma
1987 songs
Atlantic Records singles
Freestyle music songs